Tony Schumacher is an English author, screenwriter, and broadcaster.

Early life
Schumacher was born in Huyton in 1967. Before his career as a writer, he worked as a police officer and taxi driver in nearby Liverpool.

Career
Schumacher became a writer after obtaining a commission from Angie Sammons, the then-editor of Liverpool Confidential.

Schumacher's first novel, the alternate history work The Darkest Hour, is set in a 1940s-era UK after a hypothetical Nazi victory in World War II. It was generally well-received. His second book, The British Lion, was released by the William Morrow imprint of HarperCollins, and was also well received in both the USA and UK. The third novel in the John Rossett series, An Army of One, was published in August 2017. He also has several other works that he self-published, including Rear View Mirror: Stories From the Streets and the Night which recounts tales of his time as a police officer and taxi driver.

Schumacher wrote the BBC One drama series influenced by his days as a police officer in Liverpool, The Responder starring Martin Freeman, which began airing on 24 January 2022 and has received praise.

Personal life
Divorced from his first wife, Schumacher remarried. The couple have a son.

References

External links
 

British television writers
British male novelists
English male dramatists and playwrights
English television writers
English screenwriters
Living people
People from Knowsley, Merseyside
1967 births